The Mulde event was an anoxic event, and marked the second of three relatively minor mass extinctions (the Ireviken, Mulde, and Lau events) during the Silurian period.  It coincided with a global drop in sea level, and is closely followed by an excursion in geochemical isotopes.  Its onset is synchronous with the deposition of the Fröel Formation in Gotland.  Perceived extinction in the conodont fauna, however, likely represent a change in the depositional environment of sedimentary sequences rather than a genuine biological extinction.

Higher resolution δ13C isotope analysis identifies differences in the organic and carbonate carbon isotope curves (Δ13C), allowing the inference of a sustained drop in CO2 levels coincident with the extinction once sedimentological data are taken into account.

Notes
The Ireviken, Mulde, and Lau events were all closely followed by isotopic excursions.

References

Extinction events
Silurian events